Senator Duncan may refer to:

Alexander Duncan (politician) (1788–1853), Ohio State Senate
J. Ebb Duncan (1909–1980), Georgia State Senate
James H. Duncan (1793–1869), Massachusetts State Senate
Joseph Duncan (politician) (1794–1844), Illinois State Senate
Robert L. Duncan (born 1953), Texas State Senate
Thomas Duncan (American politician) (1893–1959), Wisconsin State Senate
Verne Duncan (born 1934), Oregon State Senate
William C. Duncan (1820–1877), Michigan State Senate

See also
Senator Dungan (disambiguation)